José Orlando Benítez (born 28 February 1990) is a tennis player from Paraguay. Benítez was member of the 2011 Paraguay Davis Cup team.

Sources

External links
 
 
 

1990 births
Living people
Paraguayan male tennis players
Tennis players at the 2011 Pan American Games
Pan American Games competitors for Paraguay
21st-century Paraguayan people
20th-century Paraguayan people